The Constitution Society is a nonprofit educational organization headquartered at San Antonio, Texas, U.S., and founded in 1994 by Jon Roland, an author and computer specialist who has run for public office as a Libertarian Party candidate on a "Constitutionalist Platform". The society publishes online a large selection of works on constitutional history, law, and government.

Web site
The society’s web site features digital library resources including the online Liberty Library of Constitutional Classics, launched for the purpose of hosting complete, annotated, and cross-linked copies of most of the major works written or read by the American Founders, or by persons whose writings can enable one to understand their writings. As of April 2011, it had an Alexa Traffic Rank of 78,617, with 2943 links in. It also has documents from other countries.

The ideological orientation of the site ranges from libertarian to militia support.

According to a 2010 Southern Poverty Law Center report, the site also links to conspiracy-theory sites "questioning the Oklahoma City bombing and the role of researchers in creating the HIV virus", and carries "a section on mind-control technology". Roland himself has stated that "The Feds... have actually been engaging in warlike activity against the American people." Roland also reportedly advocates the abolition of paper money in favor of gold or silver coin. Since at least 1996, Roland has held that "U.S. citizens have the right to resist an unlawful arrest", a claim assessed by Snopes as "Mostly False".

See also
 Federalist Society
 Cato Institute
 Constitution Party (United States)
 Liberty Fund
 Institute for Justice
 Independent Institute
 Independence Institute

References

External links
 Constitution Society (CS) official website.
 Constitution primary blog.

Libertarian organizations based in the United States
Organizations established in 1994
Organizations based in Austin, Texas